Ville-Veikko Salminen (23 August 1937, Turku - 16 January 2006) was a Finnish film, television, stage actor and director.  He was one of the founders of the acting companies for both Yleisradio and Mainostelevisio. He is best remembered for his roles in the films of Spede Pasanen, often playing a handsome, suave womanizer - but also had an extensive career in films and TV outside his films.

Personal life
Salminen was the son of famed Finnish filmmaker Ville Salminen and brother of cinematographer Timo Salminen. Salminen was briefly married to Laila Kinnunen, one of the most famous Finnish singers of the 1950s and 1960s.

Filmography

Actor
 Irmeli, Seitsemäntoista vuotias (1948) - Erkki Svanberg (debut)
 Laivaston monnit maissa (1954) - Vakoojia
 Laivan kannella (1954) - Ship-boy
 Säkkijärven polkka (1955) - Kylänpoika Ollilasta
 Helunan häämatka (1955) - Ville - stoker
 Viettelysten tie (1955) - Ville
 Tyttö lähtee kasarmiin (1956) - Alokas
 Evakko (1956) - Nuori Vänrikki
 Nuori mylläri (1958) - Jussi Salminen
 Sotapojan heilat (1958) - Alikersantti #2
 Ei ruumiita makuuhuoneeseen (1959) - Lentoperämies (uncredited)
 Yks' tavallinen Virtanen (1959) - Autonkuljettaja
 Taas tapaamme Suomisen perheen (1959) - Nuori mies (uncredited)
 Oho, sanoi Eemeli (1960) - Ville
 Nina ja Erik (1960) - Heikki Korte
 Kaks' tavallista Lahtista (1960) - European champion
 Autotytöt (1960) - Sailor
 Molskis, sanoi Eemeli, molskis! (1960) - Kari
 Mullin mallin (1961) - Ville
 Vaarallista vapautta (1962) - Kari
 Jengi (1963) - Kalle
 Telefon (1977) - Russian Steward
 Likainen puolitusina (1982) - Erik Lungholm
 Kuutamosonaatti (1988) - Carli
 Hurmaava joukkoitsemurha (2000) - Ermei Rankkala

Actor in Spede Pasanen films
 Harha-askel (1964)
 Kielletty kirja (1965) - Jukka Johan Kilpi
 Pohjan tähteet (1969) - Igor Lötjönen
 Speedy Gonzales - noin 7 veljeksen poika (1970) - Bat Masterson
 Saatanan Radikaalit (1971) - Vaatekaupan myyjä (uncredited)
 Viu-hah hah-taja (1974) - Jaska
 Tup-akka-lakko (1980) - Pääministerin sihteeri
 Uuno Turhapuron aviokriisi (1981) - Vetoa lyövä mies
 Uuno Turhapuro menettää muistinsa (1982) - Lääkäri
 Uuno Turhapuron muisti palailee pätkittäin (1983) - Lääkäri
 Uuno Turhapuro armeijan leivissä (1984) - Head-Waiter
 Uuno Epsanjassa (1985) - José
 Liian Iso Keikka (1986) - Nigolai Savtsenko
 Uuno Turhapuro – kaksoisagentti (1987) - Mies konserttitalolla
 Uuno Turhapuro - This is my life (2004) - Näyttelijä (final role)

As director
 Sirkka ja Sakari (1976, TV Series)
 Sämpy (1979, TV Series)
 Olet vain kahdesti nuori (1980-1982, TV Series)

Sources

External links
 

1937 births
2006 deaths
Deaths from cancer in Finland
People from Turku
Finnish male actors
Actors from Turku